Moonbase Theta, Out is a science fiction podcast created by D.J. Sylvis and produced by Monkeyman Productions.

Background 
The story follows the crew of a decommissioned moonbase as they begin to shutdown the base and prepare to leave. The majority of the moonbase's crew is in cryostasis while only five crew members are awake to keep things running. The crew have twenty weeks to completely shutdown and evacuate the moonbase. Each episode is made up of the audio reports that Roger Bragado-Fischer sends to earth at the end of each week. Bragado-Fischer also adds short messages to his husband, Alexandre, at the end of each report. The show contains dystopic themes and provides commentary on the negative impacts of capitalism. 

Moonbase Theta, Out was one of the first fifteen programs included in The Fable & Folly Network.

Format 
Each episode in the first season averages about five minutes; in later seasons the episodes are longer. There are twenty-one episodes in the first season.

Cast and crew 
D.J. Sylvis, Tina Daniels and Cass McPhee are the producers of the show.

 Leeman Kessler as Roger Bragado-Fischer
 Cass McPhee as Michell L'Anglois
 Jen Ponton as Tumnus
 Elissa Park as Nessa Cheong
 Tina Daniels as Wilder
 Tau Zaman as Ashwini Ray
 Gabriel Taneko as Alexandre Bragado-Fischer

Awards

See also 
 List of science fiction podcasts

References

External links 

Audio podcasts
Scripted podcasts
2018 podcast debuts
Science fiction podcasts
American podcasts
LGBT-related podcasts